Manolis Kallergis (born 5 December 1990) is a Greek professional footballer player who plays as a winger for Super League 2 club Kifisia.

Kallergis has played for Akadimia '94, Kechagias Prosilio and A.O. Karditsa in the 2009-10 Delta Ethniki. Since 2010, Kallergis made a total of 60 league appearances for Fokikos in the Football League and Football League 2. He signed for Atromitos in June 2012.

References

External links

1990 births
Living people
Greek footballers
Association football midfielders
Fokikos A.C. players
Atromitos F.C. players
Super League Greece players
People from Amfissa
Footballers from Central Greece